West Peak is a  peak in the Olympic Mountains, in Jefferson County of Washington state. Rising in the center of Olympic National Park, it is the highest peak on the Anderson Massif. West Peak is the hydrographic apex of the Olympic Mountains, with precipitation runoff flowing outward to the Pacific Ocean via Quinault River, the Strait of Juan de Fuca via Elwha River, and Hood Canal via the Dosewallips River. The Eel Glacier is situated in a cirque east of the summit, and an unnamed glacier resides in the south cirque. Its nearest higher peak is Mount Mystery,  to the northeast. The first ascent of the peak was made in 1930 by E. B. Hamilton. Legend has it that the mountain's name is for Mr. West, a participant in the 1890 O'Neil Expedition, rather than for its apparent position on the Anderson Massif. The West Branch of the Quinault River was named after him in 1890.

Climate

West Peak is located in the marine west coast climate zone of western North America.   Most weather fronts originate in the Pacific Ocean, and travel northeast toward the Olympic Mountains. As fronts approach, they are forced upward by the peaks of the Olympic Range, causing them to drop their moisture in the form of rain or snowfall (Orographic lift). As a result, the Olympics experience high precipitation, especially during the winter months in the form of snowfall. During winter months, weather is usually cloudy, but, due to high pressure systems over the Pacific Ocean that intensify during summer months, there is often little or no cloud cover during the summer. The best months for climbing in terms of favorable weather are June through September.

Geology

The Olympic Mountains are composed of obducted clastic wedge material and oceanic crust, primarily Eocene sandstone, turbidite, and basaltic oceanic crust. The mountains were sculpted during the Pleistocene era by erosion and glaciers advancing and retreating multiple times.

See also

 Olympic Mountains
 Geology of the Pacific Northwest
 Geography of Washington (state)

References

External links 
 West Peak weather: Mountain Forecast
 West Peak aerial photo: PBase

Mountains of Washington (state)
Mountains of Jefferson County, Washington
Olympic Mountains
Landforms of Olympic National Park
North American 2000 m summits